Le Journal du Mali is a French-language news-website and weekly newspaper in Bamako, Mali. The newspaper is owned by Impact Média Presse SARL, which also owns the website Journal du Faso, "Journal d'Abidjan" and many other websites in west Africa. The publisher is based in Bamako.

References

External links
 

Malian news websites
French-language websites